Linda Wild was the defending champion but lost in the quarterfinals to Tamarine Tanasugarn.

Fifth-seeded Wang Shi-ting won in the final 6–3, 6–4 against Chen Li-Ling.

Seeds
A champion seed is indicated in bold text while text in italics indicates the round in which that seed was eliminated.

  Linda Wild (quarterfinals)
  Yayuk Basuki (quarterfinals)
  Sandrine Testud (semifinals)
  Naoko Kijimuta (quarterfinals)
  Wang Shi-ting (champion)
  Mana Endo (quarterfinals)
  Nana Miyagi (second round)
  Francesca Lubiani (second round)

Draw

References
 1996 Nokia Open Draw

Singles